Newman College may refer to:

 Newman University College (Birmingham)
 Newman College, Perth - A private Catholic school in Churchlands, Perth
 Newman College (University of Melbourne)
 Newman College, Thodupuzha
 Newman Catholic College - a secondary school in London, England
 Newman College, Dublin - is a now closed, for profit private college in Dublin, Ireland

See also
 Newman University (disambiguation)